Piz Bial is a mountain of the Albula Alps, located in Graubünden, Switzerland. It is situated between the Val Mulix and the Val Bever. The closest locality is Preda, on the Albula Railway.

References

External links
 Piz Bial on Hikr

Mountains of the Alps
Alpine three-thousanders
Mountains of Switzerland
Mountains of Graubünden
Bergün Filisur